The 2022 United States Senate election in Utah was held on November 8, 2022, to elect a member of the United States Senate to represent the State of Utah. Incumbent Senator Mike Lee, who was first elected in 2010, won re-election to a third term, defeating Evan McMullin, an independent candidate who was endorsed by the Utah Democratic Party.

This was the first Senate election in Utah's history in which there was no Democratic nominee. Lee's performance was the worst for a Republican in a Utah U.S. Senate election since 1974, while McMullin's was the best ever for an Independent in a Utah U.S. Senate race and the best for a non-Republican since 1976.

Republican primary
Incumbent U.S. Senator Mike Lee won over 70% of the vote at the Utah Republican Party state convention on April 23, 2022. Though considered by the party to be its nominee, a primary was still held on June 28, 2022 after two other candidates garnered enough signatures to qualify.

Candidates

Nominee 

 Mike Lee, incumbent U.S. Senator (2011–present)

Eliminated in primary 
 Becky Edwards, state representative (2009–2018)
 Ally Isom, business executive, former director of institutional messaging for the Church of Jesus Christ of Latter-day Saints and former Deputy Chief of Staff and Communications Director to former Governor Gary Herbert

Eliminated at convention

Evan Barlow, assistant professor at Weber State University
Loy Arlan Brunson, candidate for U.S. Senate in 2012 and 2018
Jeremy Friedbaum, candidate for U.S. Senate in 2010, 2012 and 2018
Laird Hamblin, biologist, children's songwriter (running as write-in)

Did not file
Benjamin Davis

Withdrawn
Brendan Wright, area planning manager for the Church of Jesus Christ of Latter-day Saints (endorsed Edwards)

Declined
Henry Eyring, assistant professor of accounting at London School of Economics and grandson of Henry B. Eyring
Erin Rider, attorney
Thomas Wright, real estate broker, chair of the Utah Republican Party (2011–2013) and candidate for Governor of Utah in 2020.

Endorsements

Polling
Graphical summary

Results

Convention

Primary

Democratic convention 
The Utah Democratic Party state convention took place on April 23, 2022. Kael Weston was the only Democrat still running; however, the party endorsed Evan McMullin's independent bid in lieu of nominating a candidate, following encouragement from many prominent Democrats in the state, including former Rep. Ben McAdams and Salt Lake County Mayor Jenny Wilson, to back McMullin's campaign.

Candidates

Eliminated at convention 

 Kael Weston, former U.S. State Department official and nominee for Utah's 2nd congressional district in 2020

Did not file 
Austin Searle, musician

Withdrew 
Nicholas Mitchell, scientist and business owner (running for Utah's 2nd congressional district)
Allen Glines, community activist and writer

Declined 
 Steve Schmidt, political commentator for MSNBC, founder of The Lincoln Project, and former Republican political strategist

Endorsements

Polling

Convention vote 
The Utah Democratic Party held a state convention on April 23, 2022, to endorse candidates for state offices. Supporters of independent candidate Evan McMullin, led by Salt Lake County mayor Jenny Wilson, introduced a motion for the state party to forgo nominating a Democratic candidate for the U.S. Senate and to instead "join Evan McMullin’s independent coalition to beat Mike Lee", contending that not doing so would split the anti-Lee vote in the general election. The motion was opposed by supporters of Kael Weston, the lone Democratic candidate for the seat who thus would have received the nomination had the motion failed. The delegates passed the motion by a 57%–43% margin.

Libertarian convention

Candidates

Nominee 
James Hansen, teacher

Eliminated at convention 
Lucky Bovo

Independent American convention

Candidates

Declared
Tommy Williams, perennial candidate

Independents

Candidates

Declared
 Evan McMullin, political activist, former CIA operations officer, and candidate for President of the United States in 2016 (Endorsed by the Democratic Party, United Utah Party, and Forward Party).

Withdrawn
Evan Barlow, assistant professor at Weber State University (running as a Republican)

General election

Predictions

Endorsements

Polling
Aggregate polls

Graphical summary

Becky Edwards vs. Evan McMullin

Ally Isom vs. Evan McMullin

Mike Lee vs. Kael Weston vs. Evan McMullin

Mike Lee vs. Steve Schmidt vs. Evan McMullin

Mike Lee vs. Steve Schmidt

Mike Lee vs. Kael Weston

Debates

Results

Counties that flipped from Republican to Independent
Grand (largest municipality: Moab)
Salt Lake (largest municipality: Salt Lake City)
Counties that flipped from Democratic to Independent
Summit (largest municipality: Park City)

See also 
 2022 United States Senate elections
 2022 Utah elections

Notes

Partisan clients

References

External links
Official campaign websites
 James Hansen (L) for Senate
 Mike Lee (R) for Senate
 Evan McMullin (I) for Senate
 Tommy Williams (Independent American) for Senate

2022
Utah
United States Senate